The Louisville, Harrods Creek and Westport Railroad was a 19th-century railway company in the U.S. state of Kentucky. It was formed from the failed Louisville, Harrods Creek and Westport Railway in 1879, gave up its predecessor's hope of reaching Westport or beyond, and simply continued service along the existing  narrow gauge railway line between Fulton Street and Harrods Creek until the company's 1881 purchase by the Louisville and Nashville Railroad.

Under the L&N, it offered passenger service on four daily round trips and principally serviced commuters living along River Road (the old Louisville–Westport Turnpike). At night, the line was employed for freight service by a lime kiln, bourbon distillery, two quarries, and nearby farms.

All service on both stretches were abandoned during the Great Depression in 1935. The LHC&W's rights-of-way continued to be employed by the L&N for freight service, however, and presently make up part of the class-I CSX Transportation system.

See also
 List of Kentucky railroads
 Louisville, Harrods Creek and Westport Railway

References

Defunct Kentucky railroads
Defunct companies based in Louisville, Kentucky
Transportation in Louisville, Kentucky
Narrow gauge railroads in Kentucky
3 ft gauge railways in the United States
Railway companies established in 1879
Railway companies disestablished in 1881